, better known as Masa Takumi, is a Japanese Grammy Award winning multi-instrumentalist, composer, and music producer.  He was nominated for a Grammy Award in 2014 for Best Reggae Album and won Best Global Music Album for his solo album, Sakura, at the 65th Annual Grammy Awards in 2023. His music video, Deep Down, was nominated for Best Independent Music Video at the Hollywood Music in Media Awards in 2018. He has written and produced songs for AAA, Da Pump, Eric Martin, and others.

Takumi is an anime TV series composer, arranger, and musician who is known for composing theme songs, arranging music, and performing on Claymore, Genshiken,  Witchblade, Peach Girl and Koi Kaze, among others.

Early life and career

Masa Takumi (also known as Masanori Takumi) was born in Osaka, Japan.  He started playing the trumpet at eight years old in his elementary school's brass band and started playing the drums and composing music at twelve years old. During his teen years he taught himself to play the guitar, bass, and piano. In 2000, Takumi joined the band, Siren where he was a songwriter, drummer, and sound producer.  The group signed a record deal with BMG Japan but disbanded in 2004 and Takumi decided to pursue composing and producing full-time.

Music career 
Takumi is a composer and music producer, and plays the guitar, piano, bass, drums, and the shamisen.

In Asia, he has written and arranged songs for major recording artists Exile, Daigo, Da Pump, Cute, AAA,  Shiritsu Ebisu Chugaku (Japan), Kara, and FT Island (South Korea), among others. Takumi also composes and produces music for numerous anime TV series such as Claymore, Witchblade, Peach Girl, Genshiken, and Koi Kaze.

He has worked with US recording artists, writing and producing music for Eric Martin and Terry Bozzio.  In 2017, he wrote the song Let’s Make A Video for Poppy and wrote Reflection for Trey Songz in 2018.

Takumi was nominated for a Grammy Award in 2014 for the album Reggae Connections, as a member of Sly and Robbie.  He released Stars Falling in 2016, and his 2017 album Deep Down won a Bronze Medal for Best Contemporary Instrumental Music at the Global Music Awards 2018. The music video for Deep Down was nominated for a Hollywood Music In Media Awards for Best Independent Music Video in 2018. In 2020, Takumi began working working with Domo Music Group and released, Heritage, which received favorable reviews.

Takumi's 2021 album release, Sakura, won a Grammy Award for Best Global Music Album in 2023.

Awards
{|class="wikitable sortable"
!Year
!Nominated work
!Category
!Award
!Result
|-
| 2023 || Sakura || Best Global Music Album || Grammy Award|| 
|-
| 2018 || Deep Down || Best Independent Music Video|| Hollywood Music in Media Award|| 
|-
| 2018 || Deep Down || Best Contemporary Instrumental Music (Bronze)|| Global Music Award   || 
|-
| 2014 || Reggae Connection || Best Reggae Album || Grammy Award ||

Discography

Music in TV, film and videos 

 2021 – Sonic Boom: Rise of Lyric: Sonic Jr and Hoopa in the Clash of Ages (film) - (featured musician)
 2013 – Pokémon: Black & White: Adventures in Unova – ending theme ("Te o Tsunagō" sung by Shiritsu Ebisu Chugaku)
 2007 – Claymore – (TV series/22 episodes) - original soundtrack
 2006 – Gift - Eternal Rainbow - (TV series/26 episodes) theme song arrangement 
 2006 – Otome wa Boku ni Koishiteru
 2006 – Witchblade - (TV series/24 episodes) music
 2004 – Genshiken - (TV series/12 episodes) - original soundtrack
 2004 – Koi Kaze (TV mini-series) - music
 2004 – Suzuka
 2005 – Peach Girl - (TV series/25 episodes) music
 2006 – Kujibiki Unbalance - music, theme song arrangement

References 

Living people
1978 births
Grammy Award winners
Japanese composers
Japanese record producers
Japanese male musicians